South County Transit (SCT Link) provides transit service in the city of Galt, CA. The service includes 3 fixed route lines in addition to a Dial-A-Ride service. Fixed route service operates Weekdays only and Dial-A-Ride operates Monday thru Saturday. Services connect to SacRT in Downtown Sacramento, Rio Vista Delta Breeze in Isleton, E-tran in Elk Grove and the Grape Line and San Joaquin RTD in Lodi.

Routes

References

Companies based in Sacramento County, California
Companies with year of establishment missing
Transit agencies in California
Transportation in San Joaquin County, California